Emma is an unincorporated community and coal town in Floyd County, Kentucky, United States.

A post office was established in the community in 1908. The origins of place name Emma are unclear: some hold it was named for the wife of the congressman John W. Langley, while others believe it was named for the wife of a prominent realtor.

References

Unincorporated communities in Floyd County, Kentucky
Unincorporated communities in Kentucky
Coal towns in Kentucky